The Greensboro Revolution was a team in the National Indoor Football League (NIFL) that began play as a 2006 expansion team.  They played their home games at the Greensboro Coliseum in Greensboro, North Carolina.

On January 23, 2008, it was announced that the team had folded, mainly due to low attendance numbers and problems off the playing field.

Season-by-season 

|-
|2006 || 5 || 9 || 0 || 4th Atlantic Eastern || --
|-
|2007 || 7 || 3 || 0 || 2nd Atlantic || --
|-
!Totals || 12 || 12 || 0

External links
Team statistics

National Indoor Football League teams
Sports in Greensboro, North Carolina
American football teams in North Carolina